Dave Hagstrom (born 1956) is an American politician. He is a member of the Montana House of Representatives from the 52nd District, serving since 2013. He is a member of the Republican party.

References

Living people
1956 births
Republican Party members of the Montana House of Representatives
Politicians from Billings, Montana
Date of birth missing (living people)